Events from the year 1330 in Ireland.

Incumbent
Lord: Edward III

Events
Gilla Isa Ruad O Ragallaig, king of East Breifne, dies; succeeded by his son Risdeard.
Adam Limberg appointed Lord Chancellor of Ireland

Births

Deaths
 John Butler of Clonamicklon, on the 6th of January.

References
"The Annals of Ireland by Friar John Clyn", edited and translated with an Introduction, by Bernadette Williams, Four Courts Press, 2007. , pp. 240–244.
"A New History of Ireland VIII: A Chronology of Irish History to 1976", edited by T. W. Moody, F.X. Martin and F.J. Byrne. Oxford, 1982. .

 
1330s in Ireland
Ireland
Years of the 14th century in Ireland